Elk City is an unincorporated community in Barbour County in the U.S. state of West Virginia. Elk City lies along West Virginia Route 57.

History
Elk City was laid out in 1869. The community takes its name from nearby Elk Creek.

The J.N.B. Crim House in Elk City is a historic home listed on the National Register of Historic Places.

References

Unincorporated communities in Barbour County, West Virginia
Unincorporated communities in West Virginia